Rebellion is an upcoming professional wrestling pay-per-view (PPV) event produced by Impact Wrestling. It will take place on April 16, 2023, at the Rebel Entertainment Complex in Toronto, Ontario, Canada. It will be the fifth event under the Rebellion chronology.

Production

Background 
Rebellion is a professional wrestling event produced by Impact Wrestling. It is annually held during the month of April, and the event was first held in 2019. At Hard To Kill, Impact Wrestling announced Rebellion would take place in on April 16, 2023, at the Rebel Entertainment Complex in Toronto, Ontario, Canada.

Storylines 
The event will feature professional wrestling matches that involve different wrestlers from pre-existing scripted feuds and storylines. Wrestlers portray villains, heroes, or less distinguishable characters in scripted events that built tension and culminated in a wrestling match or series of matches. Storylines are produced on Impact's weekly television program.

At No Surrender, Steve Maclin defeated Brian Myers, PCO, and Heath in a four-way match to become number one contender to the Impact World Championship. Later that night, world champion Josh Alexander retained his title over Rich Swann. Impact would later announce that Maclin would challenge Alexander for the title at Rebellion.

Matches

References

External links 
 

2023 Impact Wrestling pay-per-view events
2023 in Toronto
April 2023 events in Canada
Events in Toronto
Impact Wrestling Rebellion
Professional wrestling in Toronto
Scheduled professional wrestling shows